Friedrich Wilhelm Raiffeisen (30 March 1818 – 11 March 1888) was a German mayor and cooperative pioneer. Several credit union systems and cooperative banks have been named after Raiffeisen, who pioneered rural credit unions.

Life
Friedrich Wilhelm Raiffeisen was born March 30, 1818 at Hamm/Sieg (Westerwald). He was the seventh of nine children. His father Gottfried Friedrich Raiffeisen was a farmer and also served as the  mayor of Hamm. His family’s origins trace back to the 16th century in the Swabian-Franconian region. The family of his mother, Amalie Christiane Susanna Maria, born Lantzendörffer, came from the “Siegerland”. Leaving school at the age of 14 he received three years of education from a local pastor before entering the military at the age of 17. His career in the military led him to Cologne, Koblenz, and Sayn. After an eye disease forced him to resign from military service in 1843 he entered public service. He served as the mayor of several towns: from 1845 he was the mayor of Weyerbusch/Westerwald; from 1848 the mayor of Flammersfeld/Westerwald; and the mayor of Heddesdorf from 1852 until late 1865, when, at the age of 47, his worsening health cut his career short. He had contracted typhus in 1863 during an epidemic which took his wife's life. As his small pension was not sufficient to meet the needs of Raiffeisen’s family he initially started a small cigar factory and later a wine business. 

In 1867, he married the widow Maria Panseroth. She outlived him by 12 years and their marriage remained childless. He died on 11 March 1888 in Neuwied-Heddesdorf, shortly before his 70th birthday.

Work

Raiffeisen conceived of the idea of cooperative self-help during his tenure as the young mayor of Flammersfeld. He was inspired by observing the suffering of the farmers who were often in the grip of loan sharks. He founded the first cooperative lending bank, in effect the first rural credit union in 1864.

Motivated by the misery of the poor during the winter famine of 1846/47 he founded the “Verein für Selbstbeschaffung von Brod und Früchten” (Association for Self-procurement of Bread and Fruits). He bought flour with the help of private donations. The bread was baked in a community-built bakery and distributed on credit to the poorest amongst the population. A bread society as well as an aid society were founded in 1849 in Flammersfeld, and a benevolent society was created in 1854 in Heddesdorf. The societies were pre-cooperative organizations based on the principle of benevolent assistance.

To ensure  liquidity equalization between the small credit banks, in 1872 Raiffeisen created the first rural central bank at Neuwied, the “Rheinische Landwirtschaftliche Genossenschaftsbank” (Rhenish Agricultural Cooperative Bank). In 1881, Raiffeisen created a printing house in Neuwied that still exists today, carries his name and was merged in 1975 with the German cooperative publishing house “Deutscher Genossenschafts-Verlag”.

Philosophy
Raiffeisen stated that there is a connection between poverty and dependency. To fight poverty one should fight dependency first. Based on this idea he came up with the three 'S' formula: self-help, self-governance, and self-responsibility (in the original German: Selbsthilfe, Selbstverwaltung, and Selbstverantwortung). When put into practice, the necessary independence from charity, politics, and loan sharks could be established.

Organizations named for Raiffeisen
Several credit unions are named after Raiffeisen:
Raiffeisen Zentralbank, RZB, a cooperative bank based in Austria, and operating in Eastern Europe.
The Kosovo subsidiary of RZB sponsors the soccer Raiffeisen Superleague of Kosovo.
Bundesverband der Deutschen Volksbanken und Raiffeisenbanken, a federation of Raiffeisen cooperatives in Germany.
Raiffeisen (Switzerland), the federation of Raiffeisen cooperative banks in Switzerland.
Federazione Raiffeisen (Alto Adige - Sudtirol, Italia), the federation of Raiffeisen cooperative banks in the autonome province of Bozen, Sudtirol.
Raiffeisen Bank (Romania), a branch of the Raiffeisen Zentralbank.
Rabobank, officially Coöperatieve Centrale Raiffeisen-Boerenleenbank B.A., cooperative banking system in the Netherlands.
Banque Raiffeisen, Luxembourg.
KBC Bank, the C stands for Cera (Centrale Raiffeisenkas, meaning Central Raiffeisen Bank).

See also 
 Bond of association
 Franz Hermann Schulze-Delitzsch
 History of credit unions
 Microfinance

References

External links
Deutscher Raiffeisenverband e.V.
International Raiffeisen Union, dedicated to promoting the life, work and ideals of Herr Raiffeisen and his cooperative movement's ideals.

 

1818 births
1888 deaths
People from Altenkirchen (district)
People from the Rhine Province
German Calvinist and Reformed Christians
Mayors of places in Rhineland-Palatinate
German cooperative organizers
Rural community development
Cooperative theorists